Grambois is a commune in the Vaucluse department in the Provence-Alpes-Côte d'Azur region in southeastern France.

Grambois is a renovated, perched medieval village and quite close to the Luberon mountains. This small town was used for the filming La Gloire de mon père, which was released in 1990.

See also
 Côtes du Luberon AOC
 Communes of the Vaucluse department

References

Communes of Vaucluse